Timothy Peter Joseph Radcliffe, OP (born 22 August 1945) is an English Roman Catholic priest and Dominican friar who served as master of the Order of Preachers from 1992 to 2001. He is the only member of the English Province to hold that office.

Radcliffe served as director of the Las Casas Institute of Blackfriars, Oxford which promotes social justice and human rights.  He has been a supporter of outreach to LGBT Catholics.

Formation
Timothy Radcliffe was born on 22 August 1945 in London. He studied at Worth Preparatory School (Worth School) in Sussex,  Downside School in Somerset and St John's College, Oxford. He entered the Dominican Order in 1965 and was ordained a priest in 1971.

Career

During the mid-1970s, Radcliffe was based at the West London Catholic Chaplaincy.  He taught scriptures at Oxford and was elected provincial of England in 1988. In 1992, he was elected master of the Dominican Order, holding that office until 2001. During his tenure as master, Radcliffe served as ex-officio grand chancellor of the Pontifical University of Saint Thomas Aquinas in Rome.

In 2001, after the expiration of his  term as master, Radcliffe took a sabbatical year. In 2002, he became again a simple member of the Dominican community of Oxford.  He now preaches and carries out public speaking internationally.

In 2015, Radcliffe was named a consultor to the Pontifical Council for Justice and Peace.

Although not a topic Radcliffe has often written on in his numerous publications, he has publicly defended the teaching of the Catholic Church on marriage: "The Catholic Church does not oppose gay marriage. It considers it to be impossible... Marriage is founded on the glorious fact of sexual difference and its potential fertility. Without this, there would be no life on this planet, no evolution, no human beings, no future. Marriage takes all sorts of forms, from the alliance of clans through bride exchange to modern romantic love. We have come to see that it implies the equal love and dignity of man and woman. But everywhere and always, it remains founded on the union in difference of male and female. Through ­ceremonies and sacrament this is given a deeper meaning, which for Christians includes the union of God and humanity in Christ."

Honours
In 2003, Oxford awarded Radcliffe an honorary Doctor of Divinity. The Chancellor, the Right Honorable Christopher Patten, ended the award citation with the following words: "I present a man distinguished both for eloquence and for wit, a master theologian who has never disregarded ordinary people, a practical man who believes that religion and the teachings of theology must be constantly applied to the conduct of public life: the Most Reverend Timothy Radcliffe, MA, sometime Master of the Dominican Order and Grand Chancellor of the Pontifical University of St Thomas Aquinas, for admission to the honorary degree of Doctor of Divinity."Radcliffe received the 2007 Michael Ramsey Prize for theological writing for his book What Is the Point of Being A Christian? Radcliffe is a patron of the International Young Leaders Network and helped launch Las Casas Institute, dealing with issues of ethics, governance and social justice. These are both projects of Blackfriars, Oxford.

Radcliffe is also patron of Catholic AIDS Prevention and Support, Christian Approaches to Defence and Disarmament, and 'Embrace the Middle East, as well as board member of Fellowship and Aid to the Church in the East.

Bibliography

Books
Sing a New Song. The Christian Vocation. Dublin: Dominican Publications, 1999. 
I Call You Friends. London: Continuum, 2001. 
Seven Last Words. London: Burns & Oates, 2004. 
What Is the Point of Being A Christian?. London and New York: Burns & Oates, 2005. 
Just One Year: Prayer and Worship through the Christian Year, edited by Timothy Radcliffe with Jean Harrison. London: Darton, Longman and Todd for CAFOD and Christian Aid, 2006. 
Why Go to Church? The Drama of the Eucharist London: Continuum, 2008. . Archbishop of Canterbury's Lent book 2009.
Christians and Sexuality in the Time of AIDS, with Lytta Bassett.  London: Continuum.   
Take the Plunge: Living Baptism and Confirmation. London: Burns & Oates, 2012. .
The Hope that is Within You: Interviewed by Raymond Friel. Redemptorist Publications. April 2016. 
”Alive in God:A Christian Imagination”London:Bloomsbury Continuum 2019 ISBN 978-1-4729-7020-6

Articles

Letters to the Order
Vowed to Mission (1994)
The Wellspring of Hope. Study and the Annunciation of the Good News (1996)
The Identity of Religious Today (1996)
Dominican Freedom and Responsibility. Towards a Spirituality of Government (1997)
The Bear and the Nun : What is the Sense of Religious Life Today ! (1998)
The Promise of Life (1998)
The Rosary (1998)
Letter to our brothers and sisters in initial formation (1999)
To Praise, to Bless, to Preach. The Mission of the Dominican Family (2000)
The Throne of God (2000)
St Catherine of Siena (1347–1380) Patroness of Europe (2000)
The Parable of the Good Samaritan (2001)
"A city set on a hilltop cannot be hidden" A Contemplative Life (2001)
Mission to a Runaway World: Future Citizens of the Kingdom (2002)

References

External links
A selection of Radcliffe's sermons
The 15 Letters to the Order written by Radcliffe as Master of the Dominican Order between 1993 to 2001

1945 births
Living people
20th-century English Roman Catholic priests
21st-century English Roman Catholic priests
Academics of the University of Oxford
English Dominicans
Fellows of Blackfriars, Oxford
Fellows of St John's College, Oxford
Masters of the Order of Preachers
New Blackfriars people
People educated at Downside School
Roman Catholic clergy from London